Deserticossus churkini is a moth in the family Cossidae. It is found in Mongolia.

The length of the forewings is 21 mm. The forewings are yellowish-grey and the hindwings are uniform dark-grey.

References

Natural History Museum Lepidoptera generic names catalog

Cossinae
Moths described in 2006
Moths of Asia